The Commandant's House is a historic house at 264 McClellan Drive in Walnut Ridge, Arkansas.  It is a single story wood-frame structure, with a side-gable main block flanked by front gable wings, giving it a U shape.  The house was built in 1942 by the United States Army as the residence of the commander of the Walnut Ridge Army Flying School, and is the only building known to survive from that endeavor.  It was also later the home of H.E. Williams, the founder of the nearby Williams Baptist College.

The house was listed on the National Register of Historic Places in 2010.

See also
National Register of Historic Places listings in Lawrence County, Arkansas

References

Houses on the National Register of Historic Places in Arkansas
Colonial Revival architecture in Arkansas
Houses completed in 1942
Houses in Lawrence County, Arkansas
1942 establishments in Arkansas
National Register of Historic Places in Lawrence County, Arkansas